In mathematics, specifically abstract algebra, if  is an (abelian) group with identity element  then  is said to be a norm on  if:

Positive definiteness: ,
Subadditivity: ,
Inversion (Symmetry): .

An alternative, stronger definition of a norm on  requires

,
,
.

The norm  is discrete if there is some real number  such that  whenever .

Free abelian groups 
An abelian group is a free abelian group if and only if it has a discrete norm.

References

Abelian group theory